Michael Wiesenberg is a technical writer, author, and former poker player.

Career 
Wiesenberg played poker professionally for 10 years before becoming a technical writer. He contributed for many years to the original Gambling Times magazine, writing about keno and poker. He had a biweekly column in the original Poker Player for five years and in Pan Player + for two (a defunct magazine for panguingue players). He had a monthly column for three years in Dr. Dobb's Journal, a computer magazine, and a monthly column for two years in A+, a magazine for Apple Computer users. He has contributed articles to PC Publishing, MicroTimes, Gambling Times, InfoWorld, Gaming & Wagering Business, Casino & Sports, and was an occasional contributor of articles to inCider, The San Jose Mercury, The San Francisco Chronicle, Science '84, and Desktop Publishing. He has also constructed crosswords for national crossword puzzle magazines and newspapers. His puzzles appeared monthly for five years in LA Direct, and seven years online at Poker Pages and Puzzle Planet, and has had puzzles in the New York Times. In 2011, he contributed a crossword puzzle to the Los Angeles Times that contained no instances of the letter E. He was also the editor for four years of two newsletters sent twice-monthly through Card Player's website and the content editor of the site.

He wrote the rules and games descriptions sections for online poker cardrooms Full Tilt Poker and Planet Poker.

Publications

References

External links
Card Player articles

American poker players
American technology writers
American male journalists
American gambling writers
Year of birth missing (living people)
Living people